Cui Yanzhao, courtesy name Siwen, was an official of the Chinese Tang Dynasty, serving as a chancellor during the reign of Emperor Xizong.

Background 
It is not known when Cui Yanzhao was born.  He was from the "Lesser Branch" of the prominent Cui clan of Qinghe (清河, in modern Xingtai, Hebei), and his ancestors originally claimed ancestry from the ruling house of the Spring and Autumn period state Qi. Cui Yanzhao's traceable ancestry included officials of Han Dynasty (including Cui Yan), Liu Song, Northern Wei, and Tang Dynasty.  However, neither his grandfather Cui Zhi nor his father Cui Qi was listed with any official titles.  Cui Yanzhao and Wang Ning were cousins (their mothers were sisters), but they developed an enmity because Wang passed the imperial examinations in the Jinshi class first and became arrogant.  On one occasion after Wang did so (but before Cui would eventually do so as well, in 849), when Cui was at Wang's house, Wang met him while dressed informally (thus showing a lack of respect), and further commented to Cui, "Maybe you should take the Mingjing [(明經)] examination instead." This greatly offended Cui, as the Mingjing examination was considered far less prestigious than the Jinshi examination.  Still, even by this point, Cui was known for his deep understanding of Confucianism.  After Cui himself passed the imperial examinations in 849 (during the reign of Emperor Xuānzong), he served on the staffs of several regional governors.  He was known for his understanding of the economy as well as administrative capabilities.

During Emperor Yizong's reign 
Early in the Xiantong era (860-874) of Emperor Xuānzong's son and successor Emperor Yizong, Cui Yanzhao became Bingbu Langzhong, a low-level official at the ministry of defense (兵部, Bingbu); he was then promoted to be Bingbu Langzhong, a supervisory official at the ministry of defense, and put in charge of drafting edicts.  He was then made Zhongshu Sheren, a mid-level official at the legislative bureau of government (中書省, Zhongshu Sheng), and later deputy minister of census and director of finances.

In 869, Cui was made the military governor (Jiedushi) of Heyang Circuit (河陽, headquartered in modern Jiaozuo, Henan) and the prefect of Heyang's capital Meng Prefecture.  In 871, he was transferred to Hedong Circuit (河東, headquartered in modern Taiyuan, Shanxi), to serve as its military governor and the mayor of its capital Taiyuan Municipality.  It was said that at that time, the Shatuo tribesmen of the region did not obey Tang laws, and the circuit was much disturbed.  Cui governed the circuit with both grace and might, and within a span of three years, the circuit had become peaceful.  According to his biographies in both the Old Book of Tang and the New Book of Tang, when he was initially set to be transferred to another circuit at that point, the senior residents of the circuit submitted a petition requesting that he remain at Hedong, and Emperor Yizong agreed.

During Emperor Xizong's reign 
Emperor Yizong died in 873 and was succeeded by his young son Emperor Xizong.  At that time, one of the chancellors was Zhao Yin, who passed the Jinshi examination in the same year as Cui Yanzhao, and Zhao recommended Cui as having economic abilities. In 874, Cui was recalled from Hedong to serve as the deputy minister of civil service affairs (吏部侍郎, Libu Shilang) and the director of the salt and iron monopolies. Later in the year, when he was referred to as deputy minister of defense (兵部侍郎, Bingbu Shilang) and director of finances, he was made Zhongshu Shilang, the deputy head of the legislative bureau, and given the designation Tong Zhongshu Menxia Pingzhangshi, making him a chancellor de facto. As chancellor, Cui assisted his senior colleague Xiao Fang in reforming the chancellors' office (as several recent chancellors, Yang Shou, Lu Yan, and Wei Baoheng, had just recently been exiled and then put to death for their corruption as chancellors).

Despite his high status, Cui, who was considered filially pious, and he attended to his mother daily as if he were a civilian.  When he became chancellor, however, his mother, fearful that he would punish his cousin Wang Ning, who was then the deputy minister of defense, commented to her maid servant within Cui's earshot, "Make some new socks and shoes for me. Deputy Minister Wang and his mother will surely be exiled to the wilderness. I will leave with my sister." Cui bowed and wept, stating, "I will never do that."  Therefore, Wang was not punished.

In 876, because of illness, Cui was removed from his chancellor position and made a senior advisor to the Crown Prince.  He died thereafter, but when he did so is not known.

Notes

References
 Old Book of Tang, vol. 178.
 New Book of Tang, vol. 183.
 Zizhi Tongjian, vol. 252.

9th-century deaths
Chancellors under Emperor Xizong of Tang
Tang dynasty economists
Tang dynasty jiedushi of Heyang Circuit
Tang dynasty jiedushi of Hedong Circuit
Mayors of Taiyuan
Year of birth unknown
Cui clan of Qinghe